Peter Washington  (born in Los Angeles on August 28, 1964) is a jazz double bassist. He played with the Westchester Community Symphony at the age of 14. Later he played electric bass in rock bands. He attended the University of California, Berkeley, where he majored in English Literature, and performed with the San Francisco Youth Symphony and the UC Symphony Orchestra.  His growing interest in jazz led him to play with John Handy, Bobby Hutcherson, Harold Land, Frank Morgan, Ernestine Anderson, Chris Connor and other Bay Area luminaries. In 1986 he joined Art Blakey and The Jazz Messengers and moved to New York City. Beginning in the 1990s, he toured with the Tommy Flanagan trio until Flanagan's death in 2001, and has played with the Bill Charlap trio since then. He was a founding member of the collective hard bop sextet One for All and is a visiting artist with the Chicago Symphony Orchestra.

In 2008, Washington played with The Blue Note 7, an all-star septet formed in honor of the 70th anniversary of Blue Note Records. His extensive discography numbers more than 400 recordings, and speaks to a constant demand for his services as a versatile side man.

Discography

With Toshiko Akiyoshi
Carnegie Hall Concert (Columbia, 1992)
Night and Dream (Nippon Crown, 1993)
Dig (Nippon Crown, 1999)

With Eric Alexander 
New York Calling (Criss Cross, 1992)
Full Range (Criss Cross, 1994)
Heavy Hitters (Alfa Jazz, 1998)
Extra Innings (Alfa Jazz, 1998)
The First Milestone (Milestone, 1999)
The Second Milestone (Milestone, 2000)

With Harry Allen
Day Dream (BMG, 1998)
Harry Allen Plays Ellington Songs with the Bill Charlap Trio (RCA Victor, 2000)
Blues For Pres And Teddy (Swing Bros, 2011)

With Karrin Allyson
In Blue (Concord, 2002)
Footprints (Concord, 2006)

With Ernie Andrews
No Regrets (Muse, 1993)
The Great City (Muse, 1995)

With Ray Appleton
Killer Ray Rides Again (Sharp Nine, 1996)

With François Aubin
Jazz Project 2 (CD Baby, 2011)

With Rob Bargad
Better Times (Criss Cross, 1993)

With Kenny Barron
Flight Path (Candid, 2015)

With Burak Bedikyan
Circle of Life (SteepleChase, 2013)

With Bob Belden
Shades of Blue (Blue Note, 1996)

With Marcus Belgrave
Live at Kerrytown Concert House (Detroit Jazz, 1995)

With Tony Bennett and Diana Krall
Love Is Here to Stay (Verve, 2018)

With Andy Bey
Shades of Bey (Evidence, 1998)
Tuesdays in Chinatown (Warlock, 2001)
Ain't Necessarily So (12th Street, 2007)

With Walter Bishop, Jr.
What's New (DIW, 1991)

With Art Blakey and The Jazz Messengers 
Art Blakey And Jazz Messengers (Arco, 1986)
Feeling Good (Delos, 1986)
Hard Champion (Paddle Wheel, 1987)
Blue Moon (Zounds, 1987)
Not Yet (Soul Note, 1988)

With The Blue Note 7
Mosaic: A Celebration of Blue Note Records (Blue Note, 2009)

With Sacha Boutros
New York After Dark (Diva Latina Productions: Sacha Boutros, 2013)
New York Apres Minuit (Diva Latina Productions: Sacha Boutros, 2018)

With The Boys Choir of Harlem
Christmas Carols & Sacred Songs (Blue Note, 1996)

With Bobby Broom
No Hype Blues (Criss Cross, 1995)

With Cecil Brooks III
Hangin' with Smooth (Muse, 1990)
Our Mister Brooks (32 Jazz, 2000)

With Bubba Brooks
Smooth Sailing (TCB, 1995)

With Ray Bryant
No Problem (EmArcy, 1994)

With Kenny Burrell
Then Along Came Kenny (Evidence, 1993 [1996])
Midnight at the Village Vanguard (Evidence, 1993 [1997])
Be Yourself: Live at Dizzy's Club Coca-Cola (HighPoint, 2008)

With Donald Byrd
Getting Down to Business (Landmark, 1989)
Landmarks (32 Jazz, 1998)

With George Cables
Cables Fables (SteepleChase, 1991)
Looking for the Light (MuseFX, 2003)

With Ann Hampton Callaway
Easy Living (Sin-Drome, 1999)

With The Carnegie Hall Jazz Band
The Carnegie Hall Jazz Band (Blue Note, 1996)

With Regina Carter
Rhythms of the Heart (Verve, 1999)

With James Carter
Gardenias for Lady Day (Columbia, 2003)

With Celtic Jazz Collective
Aislinn (A Vision) (Mapleshade, 2001)

With Bill Charlap
All Through the Night (Criss Cross, 1998)
S'Wonderful (Venus, 1998)
Written in the Stars (Blue Note, 2000)
Stardust (Blue Note, 2002)
Somewhere: The Songs of Leonard Bernstein (Blue Note, 2004)
Plays George Gershwin: The American Soul (Blue Note, 2005)
Live at The Village Vanguard (Blue Note, 2007)
I'm Old Fashioned (Venus, 2010)
Notes From New York (Impulse!, 2015)
The Silver Lining: The Songs Of Jerome Kern (RPM, 2015)
Uptown, Downtown (Impulse!, 2017)
Street of Dreams (Blue Note, 2021)

With Ray Charles
Genius + Soul = Jazz (Concord, 2010)

With Ed Cherry
First Take (Groovin' High, 1993)

With David Chesky
Jazz In the New Harmonic (Chesky, 2012)
Primal Scream (Chesky, 2014)

With Jimmy Cobb
Cobb's Corner (Chesky, 2007)

With Anat Cohen
Clarinetwork: Live at the Village Vanguard (Anzic, 2010)

With Joe Cohn
Shared Contemplations (Criss Cross, 2009)

With Freddy Cole
Because Of You (HighNote, 2006)
Music Maestro Please (HighNote, 2007)

With Eric Comstock
No One Knows (Harbinger, 2005)

With Bill Cosby
My Appreciation (Polygram, 1991)
Hello, Friend: To Ennis With Love (Verve, 1997)

With Stanley Cowell
Setup (SteepleChase, 1994)

With Jeremy Davenport
Maybe in a Dream (Telarc, 1997)

With Charles Davis
Reflections (Red, 1990)
Blue Gardenia (Reade Street, 2003)

With Jesse Davis
High Standards (Concord. 1994)
Live at Small's (Smallslive, 2012)

With Steve Davis
Vibe Up! (Criss Cross, 1998)
Systems Blue (Criss Cross, 2001)
Think Ahead (Smoke Sessions, 2017)

With Peter Delano
Bite of the Apple (Verve, 1994)

With Dena DeRose
Love's Holiday (Sharp Nine, 2002)

With Mike DiRubbo
Human Spirit (Criss Cross, 2002)

 With Kenny Drew, Jr.
 Passionata (Meldac Jazz, 1995)

With Billy Drummond
The Gift (Criss Cross, 1993)
Dubai (Criss Cross, 1995)

With Teddy Edwards
Horn to Horn (Muse, 1994)

With Mark Elf
A Minor Scramble (Jen Bay, 1997)
Glad To Be Back (Jen Bay, 2004)
Liftoff (Jen Bay, 2006)
Mark Elf Returns 2014 (Jen Bay, 2014)

With Mercer Ellington
Only God Can Make a Tree (MusicMasters, 1996)

With Dave Ellis
State of Mind (Milestone, 2003)

With Robin Eubanks
Different Perspectives (JMT, 1988)

With Georgie Fame
Poet in New York (Go Jazz, 2000)

With Joe Farnsworth
Time to Swing (Smoke Sessions, 2020)

With Tommy Flanagan
Lady Be Good ... For Ella (Groovin' High, 1993)
Sea Changes (Alfa Jazz, 1996)
Sunset and the Mockingbird (Blue Note, 1997)

With Flutology
First Date (Capri, 2003)

With Ricky Ford
Tenor Madness Too! (Muse, 1992)

With Tomas Franck
Tomas Franck in New York (Criss Cross, 1990)

With Nnenna Freelon
Maiden Voyage (Concord, 1998)

With Joe Friedman
Cup O' Joe (NASMusic 3, 2006)

With Andy Fusco
Out of the Dark (Criss Cross, 1998)

With Giacomo Gates
Fly Rite (Sharp Nine, 1998)

With Chantale Gagné
The Left Side of the Moon (2014)

With Dizzy Gillespie
To Diz with Love (Telarc, 1996)

With Greg Gisbert
On Second Thought (Criss Cross, 1994)

With Dave Glasser
Uh! Oh! (Nagel Hayer, 2000)
Dreams Askew, Dreams Anew (Artemis, 2001)

With Benny Golson
Benny Golson Quartet Live (Dreyfus, 1989 [1991])
Remembering Clifford (Milestone, 1998)
Brown Immortal (Keystone, 2005)

With Jon Gordon
Possibilities (Double-Time, 2000)

With Benny Green
Prelude (Criss Cross, 1988)
Source (Jazz Legacy, 2011)
Magic Beans (Sunnyside, 2013)

With Johnny Griffin
Dance of Passion (Antilles, 1993)

With Don Grolnick
London Concert (Fuzzy Music, 2000)

With Russell Gunn
Young Gunn (Muse, 1994)
Young Gunn Plus (32 Jazz, 1998)

With Jeff Hackworth
How Little We Know (Big Bridge, 2007)

With Tim Hagans & Marcus Printup
Hub Songs: The Music of Freddie Hubbard (Blue Note, 1998)

With Waturo Hamasaki
Holiday (Concept, 2015)
Prisoner Of Love (Concept, 2017)

With Scott Hamilton
Back in New York (Concord, 2005)

With Lionel Hampton
Mostly Ballads (MusicMasters, 1990)

With Tom Harrell
Passages (Chesky, 1991)
Upswing (Chesky, 1994)
Trumpet Legacy (Milestone, 1998)

With Barry Harris
Eastwood After Hours: Live at Carnegie Hall (Malpaso, 1997)

With Michael Hashim
Guys and Dolls (Stash, 1992)
Multicolored Blue (Hep, 1999)

With Hiroshi Hata
Introducing Hiroshi Hata (Kaneha, 1998)
Door To Door (Kaneha, 2001)

With David Hazeltine
The Classic Trio (Sharp Nine, 1996)
Four Flights Up (Sharp Nine, 1996)
How It Is (Criss Cross, 1997)
A World For Her (Criss Cross, 1998)
The Classic Trio, Volume 2 (Sharp Nine, 2001)
Pearls (Tokuma, 2001)
Señor Blues (Venus, 2001)
Close To You (Criss Cross, 2003)
Manhattan Autumn (Sharp Nine, 2003)
Perambulation (Criss Cross, 2005)
Blues Quarters Vol. 2 (Criss Cross, 2006)

With Jimmy Heath Big Band
Turn Up the Heat (Planet Arts, 2007)
Togetherness: Live at The Blue Note (Jazz Legacy, 2013)

With Percy Heath
A Love Song (Daddy Jazz, 2002)

With Eddie Henderson
Tribute to Lee Morgan (NYC, 1995)

With Ian Hendrickson-Smith
Still Smokin (Sharp Nine, 2004)With Conrad HerwigHeart of Darkness (Criss Cross, 1997)With Steve HobbsOn the Lower East Side (Candid, 1993)
Second Encounter (Candid, 2003)
Spring Cycle (Random Chance, 2005)
Vibes, Straight Up (Challenge, 2009)
Tribute to Bobby (Challenge, 2018)With Holly HofmannMinor Miracle (Capri, 2004)With Freddie HubbardMMTC: Monk, Miles, Trane & Cannon (MusicMasters, 1995)
God Bless the Child (MusicMasters, 1998)With Bobby HutchersonMirage  (Landmark, 1991)With Javon JacksonWhen the Time Is Right (Blue Note, 1994)
For One Who Knows (Blue Note, 1995)
A Look Within (Blue Note, 1996)
Good People (Blue Note, 1997)With The Jazz MessengersThe Legacy of Art Blakey (Telarc, 1998)With Steve KaldestadNew York Afternoon (Cellar Live, 2015)With Geoff KeezerHere and Now (Blue Note, 1991)With Jonny KingNotes from the Underground (Enja, 1996)With Anna KolchinaWild Is the Wind (Venus, 2017)With Lee KonitzFrescalalto (Decca, 2017)With David LahmJazz Takes On Joni Mitchell (Arkadia, 1999)With The Lalama Brothers'''Erie Avenue (Lalama, 2011)With Ralph LalamaFeelin' and Dealin (Criss Cross, 1990)
Circle Line (Criss Cross, 1996)
Music For Grown-Ups (Criss Cross, 1998)With Andy LaVerneBud's Beautiful (SteepleChase, 1996)With Mike LeDonneSoulmates (Criss Cross, 1993)
Waltz For An Urbanite (Criss Cross, 1995)
To Each His Own (Double-Time, 1998)
Then and Now (Double-Time, 1999)With David LeonhardtReflections (Big Bang, 1994)With Deborah LippmanNightingale (NJ, 2005)With Jan LundgrenNew York Calling (Alfa Jazz, 1995)With Brian LynchBack Room Blues (Criss Cross, 1990)
Keep Your Circle Small (Sharp Nine, 1995)With Teo MaceroImpressions of Miles Davis (Orchard, 2001)With Joe MagnarelliWhy Not (Criss Cross, 1994)
Philly-New York Junction (Criss Cross, 1998)
New York-Philly Junction (Criss Cross, 2003)
Persistence (Reservoir, 2008)With MaltaManhattan in Blue (JVC Victor, 2004)With Junior ManceMusic of Thelonious Monk (Chiaroscuro, 2003)With Claire MartinMake This City Ours (Linn, 1997)With Akane MatsumotoMemories Of You (Concept, 2015)With Bill MaysAt the Movies (SteepleChase, 2009)With Marian McPartlandAn NPR Jazz Christmas with Marian McPartland and Friends (NPR, 1997)With Charles McPhersonFirst Flight Out (Arabesque, 1994)With MessageThe Art of Blakey (King, 1993)With Mulgrew MillerTime and Again (Landmark, 1992)With Antoinette MontaguePretty Blues (Consolidated Artists, 2006)With Ralph MooreRejuvenate! (Criss Cross, 1988)
Images (Landmark, 1989)
Furthermore (Landmark, 1990)
Who It Is You Are (Savoy, 1994)With Fabio MorgeraThe Pursuit (Ken, 1991)With Dado MoroniInsights (Jazz Focus, 1996)
Shapes (TCB, 2010)With Ronald MuldrowDiaspora (Enja, 1995)
Facing Wes (Kokopelli, 1996)
Freedom's Serenade (Double-Time, 1999)
Mapenzi (Joh-Bev, 2003)With Lewis NashRhythm Is My Business (Evidence, 1993)
The Highest Mountain (Cellar Live, 2011)With Steve NelsonNew Beginnings (TCB, 1999)
Sound-Effect (HighNote, 2007)
Brothers Under the Sun (HighNote, 2017)With New StoriesHope Is In the Air: The Music of Elmo Hope (Origin, 2004)With David "Fathead" NewmanMr. Gentle Mr. Cool (Kokopelli, 1994)
Diamondhead (HighNote, 2008)With Dan NimmerYours Is My Heart Alone (Venus, 2008)With Trisha O'BrienOut of a Dream (Azica, 2010)With Ferit OdmanNommo (Equinox, 2010)
Autumn in New York (Equinox, 2011)
Dameronia With Strings (Equinox, 2015)With One For AllToo Soon To Tell (Sharp Nine, 1997)
Optimism (Sharp Nine, 1998)
Upward and Onward (Criss Cross, 1999)
Live at Smoke: Volume 1 (Criss Cross, 2001)
The End of a Love Affair (Venus, 2001)
Wide Horizons (Criss Cross, 2002)
Blueslike (Criss Cross, 2003)With Jeremy PeltClose To My Heart (MAXJAZZ, 2003)
The Art of Intimacy, Vol. 1 (HighNote, 2020)With Rich PerrySo In Love (SteepleCahse, 1997)With Houston PersonA Little Houston on the side (32 Jazz, 1999)
Sentimental Journey (HighNote, 2002)
The Art and Soul of Houston Person (HighNote, 2008)With Jimmy PonderSoul Eyes (Muse, 1991)
Something to Ponder (Muse, 1994 [1996])With Valery PonomarevLive at Sweet Basil (Reservoir, 1993)With The Power QuintetHigh Art (HighNote, 2016)With Simon RattleClassic Ellington (EMI Classics, 2000)
Americana (EMI Classics, 2004)
American Music (EMI Classics, 2008)
Duke Ellington: Mainly Black (EMI Classics, 2010)With Reeds and Deeds'''Wailin (Criss Cross, 2005)

With Ben Riley's Monk Legacy Septet
Memories of T (Concord, 2006)

With Wallace Roney
Seth Air (Muse, 1991)
According to Mr. Roney (32 Jazz, 1997)
No Job Too Big or Small (Muse, 1999)

With Renee Rosnes
Ancestors (Blue Note, 1996)
With a Little Help from My Friends (Blue Note, 2001)
A Time For Love (VideoArts, 2005)
Written in the Rocks (Smoke Sessions, 2016)
Beloved of the Sky (Smoke Sessions, 2018)

With Annie Ross
Music Is Forever (DRG, 1996)

With Jim Rotondi
Excursions (Criss Cross, 1998)
Destination Up (Sharp Nine, 2001)

With David Sanchez
The Departure (Columbia, 1994)

With Randy Sandke
Cliffhanger (Nagel Heyer, 1999)
Rediscovered Louis and Bix (Nagel Heyer, 2000)

With Rob Schneiderman
Dark Blue (Reservoir, 1994)

With Stephen Scott
Something to Consider (Verve, 1991)

With Charlie Sepulveda
The New Arrival (Antilles, 1991)

With Vladimir Shafranov
Live at Groovy (Kompass, 1992)
Whisper Not (Venus, 2012)

With Ian Shaw
A World Still Turning (441, 2003)

With Marlena Shaw
Dangerous (Concord, 1996)

With Don Sickler
Night Watch (Uptown, 1990)
Reflections (HighNote, 2002)

With Derek Smith
Beautiful Love (Venus, 2009)

With Neal Smith
Some of My Favorite Songs Are... (NAS, 2005)

With Tommy Smith
The Sound of Love (Linn, 1999)

With The Smithsonian Jazz Masterworks Orchestra
Tribute to a Generation: A Salute to the Big Bands (Smithsonian Folkways, 2004)

With Jim Snidero
Mixed Bag (Criss Cross, 1987)
Blue Afternoon (Criss Cross, 1989)
Storm Rising (Ken, 1990)
Urban Tales (Square Discs, 1991)
While You Are Here (Red, 1992)
Vertigo (Criss Cross, 1994)

With Terrell Stafford
This Side of Strayhorn (MAXJAZZ, 2011)
Brotherlee Love: Celebrating Lee Morgan (Capri, 2015)

With Mary Stallings
Feelin' Good (HighNote, 2015)

With Grant Stewart
Downtown Sounds (Criss Cross, 1992)
More Urban Tones (Criss Cross, 1995)
Wailin (Criss Cross, 2004)
In the Still of the Night (Sharp Nine, 2007)
The Shadow of Your Smile (Sharp Nine, 2007)
Young at Heart (Sharp Nine, 2007)
Around the Corner (Sharp Nine, 2010)

With Joan Stiles
Hurly-Burly (Oo-Bla-Dee, 2005)

With Byron Stripling
Stripling Now! (Nagel Heyer, 1999)
Byron, Get One Free (Nagel Heyer, 2001)

With Sub Dub
Original Masters: 1993-1995 (The Agriculture, 2001)

With Helen Sung
(re)Conception (SteepleChase, 2011)

With John Swana
Introducing John Swana (Criss Cross, 1990)
In the Moment (Criss Cross, 1995)
Bright Moments (Criss Cross, 2007)

With Lew Tabackin
I'll Be Seeing You (Concord, 1992)
What a Little Moonlight Can Do (Concord, 1994)
Tenority (Concord, 1996)

With Nino Tempo
Tenor Saxophone (Atlantic, 1990)

With Steve Turre
Viewpoint (Stash, 1987)
In the Spur of the Moment (Telarc, 2000)
TNT (Trombone-N-Tenor) (Telarc, 2001)
One4J: Paying Homage to J.J. Johnson (Telarc, 2003)
Keep Searchin' (HighNote, 2006) 
Rainbow People (HighNote, 2008)
The Bones of Art (HighNote, 2013)

With Michal Urbaniak
Songbird (SteepleChase, 1990)
Some Other Blues (SteepleChase, 1994)

With Bennie Wallace
Someone to Watch over Me (Enja, 1998)
In Berlin (Tokuma, 2002)
Moodsville (Groove Note, 2002)

With Cedar Walton
Seasoned Wood (HighNote, 2008)

With Jon Weber
Simple Complex (2nd Century Jazz, 2004)

With Cory Weeds-Bill Coon Quartet
With Benefits (Cellar Live, 2013)

With Walt Weiskopf
Simplicity (Criss Cross, 1992)
Song For My Mother (Criss Cross, 1995)

With Jerry Weldon
Head to Head (Criss Cross, 1999)

With Paula West
Come What May (Hi Horse, 2001)

With Chip White
More Dedications (Dark Colors, 2009)

With Wesla Whitfield
September Songs: The Music of Wilder, Weill and Warren (HighNote, 2003)

With James Williams
Jazz Dialogues, Vol. 2: Focus (FINAS, 2002)
Jazz Dialogues, Vol. 3: Out of Nowhere (FINAS, 2003)

With Tom Williams
Introducing Tom Williams (Criss Cross, 1991)
Straight Street (Criss Cross, 1993)

With Gerald Wilson
In My Time (Mack Avenue, 2005)
Monterey Moods (Mack Avenue, 2007)
Detroit (Mack Avenue, 2009)
Legacy (Mack Avenue, 2011)

With Mike Wofford
Live at Athenaeum Jazz (Capri, 2004)

With Phil Woods
The Rev and I (Blue Note, 1998)
Voyage (Chiaroscuro, 2001)

With Richard Wyands
Reunited (Criss Cross, 1995)
Get Out Of Town (SteepleChase, 1997)
Lady of Lavender Mist (Venus, 1998)
Half and Half (Criss Cross, 1999)
The Gigi Gryce Project (Jazz Legacy, 1999)

With Miki Yamaoka
I Remember Clifford (Denon, 1996)

With Aki Yashiro
Yume no Yoru - Live In New York (Universal, 2013)

With Peter Zak
Down East (SteepleChase, 2010)
Nordic Noon (SteepleChase, 2011)
The Eternal Triangle (SteepleChase, 2012)
The Disciple (SteepleChase, 2013)

References

1964 births
Living people
Musicians from Los Angeles
American jazz double-bassists
Male double-bassists
The Jazz Messengers members
UC Berkeley College of Letters and Science alumni
21st-century double-bassists
American male jazz musicians
The Blue Note 7 members